Nova Vas is a village in the hills south of Višnja Gora in the Municipality of Ivančna Gorica in central Slovenia. The area is part of the historical region of Lower Carniola. The municipality is now included in the Central Slovenia Statistical Region.

Church

The local church is dedicated to Saint Leonard and belongs to the Parish of Višnja Gora. It dates to the 14th century.

References

External links
Nova Vas on Geopedia

Populated places in the Municipality of Ivančna Gorica